The orange-tufted spiderhunter (Arachnothera flammifera) is a species of bird in the family Nectariniidae.  It is found in the southern and eastern Philippines. It was originally considered a subspecies of the little spiderhunter.

References
Moyle, R.G., S.S. Taylor, C.H. Oliveros, H.C. Lim, C.L. Haines, M.A. Rahman, and F.H. Sheldon. 2011. Diversification of an endemic Southeast Asian genus: phylogenetic relationships of the spiderhunters (Nectariniidae: Arachnothera). Auk 128: 777–788.

orange-tufted spiderhunter
Endemic birds of the Philippines
orange-tufted spiderhunter
orange-tufted spiderhunter